The Franciscan Church, also known as the Church of St. Jerome, is a Roman Catholic parish church dedicated to Saint Jerome and located in the historic city center of Vienna, Vienna's 1st district (Innere Stadt). It is the church of the Franciscan Order in Vienna.

Interior 
Erected in 1603 the outside facade of the Franciscan Church is Renaissance in style.  However, its interior is Baroque. The high altar depicting the Virgin Mary was designed by Andrea Pozzo in 1707. The church holds the oldest organ in Vienna. The carved Baroque organ was designed by Johann Wockerl in 1642.

 Capristan Chapel: painting of the "Martyrdom of St Capristan" by Franz Wagenschön
 Francis chapel: picture of the church's patron saint by Johann Georg Schmidt
 Crucifixion chapel: painting of the Crucifixion by Carlo Carlone

Gallery

Notes

External links

Church of St. Jerome, Franciscan Church

Franciscan churches in Austria
Roman Catholic church buildings in the Vicariate of Vienna City
Roman Catholic churches completed in 1611
17th-century Roman Catholic church buildings in Austria
Buildings and structures in Innere Stadt
1611 establishments in Austria
Establishments in the Archduchy of Austria